Yvon Lemire was a politician in Quebec, Canada.  He served as Member of the Legislative Assembly of Quebec.

He was born in 1939 in Baie-de-Shawinigan, Mauricie.

Provincial Politics

He ran as the Liberal candidate in the district of Saint-Maurice in 1981, but lost against incumbent Yves Duhaime.

He ran again in 1985 and 1989 and won each time.

In 1994, he was defeated by Claude Pinard.

References

See also
Mauricie
Saint-Maurice Legislators
Saint-Maurice Provincial Electoral District
Shawinigan, Quebec

1939 births
Living people
People from Shawinigan
Quebec Liberal Party MNAs